Dominik Halmoši (born 3 November 1987) is a Czech former professional ice hockey goaltender. He played two games with HC Plzeň in the Czech Extraliga during the 2010–11 season.

Halmoši played previously for HC Berounští Medvědi.

References

External links 

1987 births
Living people
HC Berounští Medvědi players
Motor České Budějovice players
Czech ice hockey goaltenders
HC Dukla Jihlava players
Lausitzer Füchse players
IHC Písek players
HC Plzeň players
Sportspeople from Plzeň
HC Tábor players
Czech expatriate ice hockey players in Germany